Jastrzębie may refer to:

Jastrzębie, Brodnica County in Kuyavian-Pomeranian Voivodeship (north-central Poland)
Jastrzębie, Lipno County in Kuyavian-Pomeranian Voivodeship (north-central Poland)
Jastrzębie, Świecie County in Kuyavian-Pomeranian Voivodeship (north-central Poland)
Jastrzębie, Lesser Poland Voivodeship (south Poland)
Jastrzębie, Masovian Voivodeship (east-central Poland)
Jastrzębie, Silesian Voivodeship (south Poland)
Jastrzębie, Opole Voivodeship (south-west Poland)
Jastrzębie, Pomeranian Voivodeship (north Poland)
Jastrzębie-Zdrój in Silesian Voivodeship (south Poland)